The Magician of Samarkand is a children's book by Alan Temperley which was made into a special three-part television program in 2006 for the British series Jackanory. The television special starred Ben Kingsley and was produced and directed by Nick Willing. The special was nominated for a BAFTA Children's Award in the category of drama.

Plot
An evil magician moves into a small town in Asia and becomes enamored by Anahita, a poor girl who is in love with the local prince. The magician wishes to enslave Anahita, so she and her friends scheme to overthrow him.

References

BBC children's television shows
Children's fantasy novels
2000s British children's television series